Klinovka is a rural locality (a selo) in Olkhovskoye Rural Settlement, Olkhovsky District, Volgograd Oblast, Russia. The population was 257 as of 2010. There are 6 streets.

Geography 
Klinovka is located in steppe, on the Olkhovka River, 6 km northwest of Olkhovka (the district's administrative centre) by road. Olkhovka is the nearest rural locality.

References 

Rural localities in Olkhovsky District
Tsaritsynsky Uyezd